The United States men's national basketball team competed in the 2019 FIBA Basketball World Cup and finished in seventh place. After winning the past two World Cups in 2010 and 2014, they were seeking to become the first country to capture three straight gold medals. With high-profile players electing not to participate, Team USA was devoid of A-list players from the National Basketball Association (NBA). They lost to France in the quarterfinals, ending their 58-game winning streak in FIBA (International Basketball Federation) and Olympic competition. Normally played every four years, the tournament was moved from its expected 2018 playing to avoid conflicting with  soccer's World Cup schedule.

After rule changes by FIBA in 2015, the US no longer automatically qualified for the World Cup despite winning the Olympics in 2016. Changes in timing also resulted in the qualifying rounds overlapping with the NBA's season. Consequently, USA Basketball decided to deploy squads of players mostly from the NBA G League, the NBA's development league. Coached by Jeff Van Gundy, they qualified the US for the World Cup, where the Americans switched to a team of NBA players coached by Gregg Popovich. They finished the World Cup as one of the top two countries in the Americas, directly qualifying them for the 2020 Summer Olympics in Tokyo.

Background

In 2015, FIBA changed the World Cup qualification process into a two-round tournament of home-and-away round robins over 16 months, which was similar to FIFA World Cup's process for soccer. Olympic gold no longer resulted in an automatic World Cup bid. The US was in the Americas group of 16 teams battling for 12 spots in the second round of the qualifying stage and finally for seven World Cup berths. To be eligible for the World Cup, the US first had to participate in the 2017 FIBA AmeriCup. The United States had not played in the FIBA Americas tournament since 2007; they had been exempt from qualifying, having won every prior Olympics and world championships.

Players for the qualifying squads were chosen by a USA Basketball qualification committee. Their teams were made up of players primarily from the NBA G League, since FIBA had changed the World Cup qualifiers from summer to year-round, most of which conflicted with the seasons of top professional leagues such as the NBA and the EuroLeague. Unlike in soccer, there is no culture for leagues to schedule in-season breaks for players to compete for their national team. The coach for the qualifiers was Jeff Van Gundy, who is a basketball analyst for ESPN/ABC and a former NBA head coach who coached in the NBA Finals. He made his national team coaching debut in the 2017 Americup. Van Gundy and his squads were tasked with qualifying the US for the World Cup, when the U.S would switch to a team of NBA players coached by Gregg Popovich. The five-time NBA champion Popovich of the San Antonio Spurs took over the national team from Mike Krzyzewski, who won three Olympic gold medals and two World Cups for the US.

Qualification

Playing games in North and South America, the US qualified for the World Cup after going 10–2. They relied on an assortment G League players and free agents, using a total of 54 different players in the 12 games.

First round

In the first round of qualification, games were played in three windows in November 2017 along with February and June 2018. The November team included four players from the US squad that went 5–0 to win the AmeriCup. Only two players—forward Travis Wear and guard Larry Drew II—returned for Team USA in their second qualifying window. The final window was also the first that was not during the NBA season.  While some NBA players joined their national teams, the US continued playing with G League players. Trey McKinney-Jones and Marcus Thornton joined the Americans after needing to withdraw in February on account of 10-day contracts they had signed with NBA teams. On June 28, 2018, the US lost 78–70 to Mexico. It was the Americans first loss under Van Gundy and just the second defeat in 30 games against Mexico. It was also Team USA's first loss at the national-team level since 2006. The Mexico squad had just four players from its November team that lost by 36 points to the US They added players from various professional leagues who were unavailable earlier, including former NBA player Gustavo Ayón, who was coming off a EuroLeague championship with Real Madrid. The Americans advanced after finishing the round 5–1.

Second round
In the first window of the second round, the US roster had a larger presence of players with NBA experience, though they were still mainly G League players. The June–July window in the first round conflicted with the NBA free agency period and NBA Summer League, while its first two windows were during the NBA season. For the second window, the United States again relied exclusively on G-Leaguers, using nine current players and three free agents with previous NBA experience. Nine of the 12 players had not played in the eight earlier qualifiers. The US qualified for the World Cup after rallying with a late 12–0 run against Uruguay to win 78–70.

World Cup roster

An initial pool of 35 players was named in April 2018 as candidates for the United States' 12-man roster. The list included 11 members from their 2016 Olympic gold-medal team, and five players who had won nine of the previous 10 NBA Most Valuable Player Awards. The US held its first minicamp in July 2018, which 23 of the 35 players attended. In the past, USA Basketball managing director Jerry Colangelo had mandated that players attended camps or risk disqualification; however, rules were relaxed in recent years.

In June 2019, a group of 20 players were initially invited to training camp to be held in Las Vegas in early August. A number of players withdrew leading up to camp, but replacements were named, leaving 15 candidates to vie for 12 spots on the World Cup roster. Only four of the remaining players had been NBA All-Stars: Brook Lopez, Kyle Lowry, Khris Middleton, and Kemba Walker. Of the 11 Americans who were among the 15 All-NBA selections in 2018–19, only third-team member Walker remained. Lowry withdrew after his thumb had not recovered from surgery a month earlier to repair a torn tendon he suffered in the 2019 NBA playoffs during the Toronto Raptors' championship run.

Harrison Barnes was the only player with Olympic experience (2016) on the final US roster. It had become customary for the Americans' World Cup teams to have few former Olympians. Barnes and Mason Plumlee (2014 World Cup) were the only former senior-level national team players. While Team USA typically drew fewer star players for the World Cup than the Olympics, the turnout was low even by World Cup standards. Only four members from the original 35-player pool were left on the final roster. A factor cited by Colangelo was FIBA moving the World Cup and the Olympics to back-to-back years, and its conflicts with the NBA schedule. Six NBA teams had preseason games scheduled overseas in 2019–20.

The US team was left with only two players, Middleton and Walker, who were All-Stars in the prior season. Measured either by All-Star or All-NBA selections, the remaining roster ranked among the least accomplished of any US Olympic or World Cup roster made up of NBA players since they were first allowed in 1992. Excluded was the 1998 World Championship team, which did not include NBA players due to the 1998–99 NBA lockout; they used a mix of non-NBA pro players and college players and finished with the bronze medal. The 2019 squad's two All-Stars from the prior season tied the low set by the 2004 Olympic team, which infamously did not win gold, for the fewest players coming off an All-Star season leading up to an international competition. The five career All-Star appearances of Lopez, Middleton, and Walker was the lowest ever, roughly half the total of past World Cup squads. Their All-NBA total also ranked the lowest.

Walker, who had recently signed with the Boston Celtics as a free agent, was joined on the US team by Celtics teammates Jaylen Brown, Jayson Tatum, and Marcus Smart. It was the first time Team USA had four teammates from the same NBA team.

The following were candidates to make the team:

Exhibition games
Team USA was 3–1 in exhibition games. They split two games against Australia, losing the second game 98–94. The loss ended a 78-game winning streak in major international tournaments and exhibitions with an NBA roster, which dated back to the 2006 FIBA World Championship team.

Group phase

First round

Czech Republic

Donovan Mitchell scored a team-high 16 points and led all Americans with 25 minutes played as the US won 88–67 over the Czech Republic. The Czechs took an early 11–7 lead, but the US pretty much cruised the rest of the way. NBA player Tomáš Satoranský scored a game-high 17 points and added five assists for the Czech Republic, whose game plan was to have their  point guard use his  advantage over Walker. However, Walker held his own on defense and had 13 points along with four assists. Barnes was the second-leading scorer for Team USA with 14 points.

Turkey

Middleton made two free throws with 2.1 seconds remaining in overtime to put the US ahead 93–92, and they hung on to win after Turkey's Ersan Ilyasova missed a 3-pointer as time expired. The Turks were ahead 92–91 with under 20 seconds remaining, but Cedi Osman and Doğuş Balbay missed four straight free throws to keep the Americans in the game. Tatum had forced overtime by making two of his three free throws after he was fouled shooting a 3-pointer with 0.1 seconds left in regulation.

The US led 10–2 early, and were never behind in the first half. They led 26–21 after one quarter, and were up 41–26 with 5:33 remaining in the half. However, US-born Scottie Wilbekin, who was naturalized in Turkey a year before, led a 12–0 run, and the contest remained close for the rest of the game. Ranked No. 17 in the world, Turkey figured to be the US team's toughest competition in the first round. Their lineup featured NBA players Ilyasova, Osman, Furkan Korkmaz and Semih Erden. Ilyasova had a game-high 23 points and 14 rebounds in 38 minutes. The Turks played most of the game using a 2–3 zone defense, which stalled Team USA's offense. The Americans made 14-of-40 from 3-point range and just 13-of-37 on 2-pointers.

Tatum sprained his left ankle while making the pass to a driving Middleton which led to the game-winning free throws. Initially ruled out for at least the next two games, he missed the remainder of the World Cup.

Japan

The US raced out to an 11–0 lead en route to a 53-point win over Japan, 98–45. Brown had 20 points and seven rebounds, and Walker scored 15 and Barnes added 14 in the Americans' best offensive performance to date. Team USA held Rui Hachimura, Japan's top player and the No. 9 overall pick of the 2019 NBA draft, to four points on two-of-eight shooting. Yudai Baba led the Japanese with 18 points and was their only player to score in double figures.

In addition to missing Tatum, the US played without Smart, who was suffering a left quad strain. Smart had missed most of training camp with a calf strain, also on his left side. The Americans had already qualified for the next round, which lowered the stakes for the game.

Second round

Greece

Walker scored a team-high 15 points and had six assists in a 69–53 win over Greece. The NBA's reigning most valuable player, Giannis Antetokounmpo, had 15 points and 13 rebounds for the Greeks, but his plus-minus was -17 when he was in the game. Coach Popovich went to a small lineup at times, enabling the United States to switch effectively on pick and rolls by Antetokounmpo. American center Lopez did not play at all in the game. Antetokounmpo and his brother, Thanasis Antetokounmpo, had to be separated from the US team after a hard foul by Thanasis late in the game left Barnes on his stomach.

Brazil

Walker and Myles Turner each scored 16 points in a 89–73 win over Brazil. The US advanced to the quarterfinals, and also clinched a berth in the 2020 Summer Olympics as one of the top two finishing teams from the Americas (along with Argentina).

Final round

France

France came back from a seven-point fourth quarter deficit to win 89–79 over the US, ending the Americans' 58-game winning streak in FIBA and Olympic competition. Evan Fournier scored 22 points and reigning back-to-back NBA Defensive Player of the Year Award winner Rudy Gobert had 21 points and 16 rebounds for the French. Mitchell had 29 points for Team USA, but he was held scoreless in the final period. The loss dropped the US into the fifth-place bracket.

In the third quarter, Team USA was faced with its first 10-point deficit of the tournament, when Popovich went to a small lineup. The United States went on a 20–9 run to lead 66–63 entering the final period. However, the French outscored the Americans 20–5 over the final 6:59. The US missed seven of their 11 free throws in the quarter and committed three turnovers in the final 3:07.

Serbia 

Bogdan Bogdanović scored 28 points to lead Serbia to a 94–89 win over the United States, who were assured of their worst major tournament finish ever, surpassing their sixth-place showing in the 2002 World Championship. The Serbs outscored the Americans 32–7 in the first quarter for a 25-point lead, but the US held a 33–12 advantage in the second period to trail 44–40 at the half. Entering the tournament, the US and Serbia were considered the favorites to meet for the gold medal.

Poland 

The United States won 87–74 over Poland to finish the World Cup in seventh place. The Americans received strong performances from Mitchell (16 points and 10 assists) and Joe Harris (14 points). The US was up 17 points at halftime, but Poland kept the match close for much of the second half.

Notes

References

United States at the 2019 FIBA Basketball World Cup
FIBA Basketball World Cup
United States at the FIBA Basketball World Cup